Votic, or Votian (vaďďa tšeeli, maatšeeli) [ˈvɑdʲːɑ ˈt͡ɕeːlʲi, ˈmɑːˌt͡ɕeːlʲi], is the language spoken by the Votes of Ingria, belonging to the Finnic branch of the Uralic languages. Votic is spoken only in Krakolye and Luzhitsy, two villages in Kingiseppsky District in Leningrad Oblast, Russia, and is close to extinction. In the 2020-2021 Russian census, 21 people claimed to speak Votic natively. Arvo Survo also estimated that around 100 people have knowledge of the language to some degree.

History 
Votic is one of numerous Finnic varieties known from Ingria. Votic shares some similarities with and has acquired loanwords from the adjacent Ingrian language, but also has deep-reaching similarities with Estonian to the west, which is considered its closest relative. Some linguists, including Tiit-Rein Viitso and Paul Alvre, have claimed that Votic evolved specifically from northeastern dialects of ancient Estonian. Votic regardless exhibits several features that indicate its distinction from Estonian (both innovations such as the palatalisation of velar consonants and a more developed system of cases, and retentions such as vowel harmony). According to Estonian linguist Paul Ariste, Votic was distinct from other Finnic languages, such as Finnish and Estonian, as early as the 6th century AD and has evolved independently ever since.

Isoglosses setting Votic apart from the other Finnic languages include:
 Loss of initial *h
 Palatalization of *k to  before front vowels. This was a relatively late innovation, not found in Kreevin Votic or Kukkuzi Votic.
 Lenition of the clusters *ps, *ks to 
 Lenition of the cluster *st to geminate 

Features shared with Estonian and the other southern Finnic languages include:
 Loss of word-final *n
 Shortening of vowels before *h
 Loss of  after a sonorant (clusters *lh *nh *rh)

In the 19th century Votic was already declining in favour of Russian (there were around 1,000 speakers of the language by the start of the World War I). After the Bolshevik Revolution, under Lenin, Votic had a brief revival period, with the language being taught at local schools and the first-ever grammar of Votic (Jõgõperä/Krakolye dialect) being published. But after Joseph Stalin came into power, the language began to decline. World War II had a devastating effect on the Votic language, with the number of speakers considerably decreased as a result of military offensives, deliberate destruction of villages by Nazi troops, forced migration to the Klooga concentration camp in Estonia and to Finland under the Nazi government, and the Stalinist policy of "dispersion" immediately after the war against the families whose members had been sent to Finland under the Nazi government. Since then, the Votes have largely concealed their Votic identity, pretending to be Russians in the predominantly Russian environment. But they continued to use the language at home and when talking to family members and relatives. After the death of Stalin, the Votes were no longer mistreated and many of those who had been sent away returned to their villages. But the language had considerably declined and the number of bilingual speakers increased. Because Votic was stigmatised as a language of "uneducated villagers", Votic speakers avoided using it in public and Votic children were discouraged from using it even at home because, in the opinion of some local school teachers, it prevented them from learning to speak and write in Russian properly. Thus, in the second half of the 20th century there emerged a generation of young ethnic Votes whose first language was Russian and who understood Votic but were unable to speak it.

Education 
There have been multiple attempts in Votic language education. In 1995–1998, Votic language courses were held in St. Petersburg, which were organized by Mehmet Muslimov. These courses were attended by about 30 people. In 2003–2004, courses were held again, and these were also organized by Muslimov. Muslimov has also made Votic self-study material available on the internet. During 2010–2015, there were Votic courses established, which were attended by around 10 people. There are also Votic events where studying material for Votic is given to people. In 2015, a Votic study book called "Vad'd'a sõnakopittõja" was published by Heinike Heinsoo and Nikita Djačkov. There have also been a few lessons organized by T.F. Prokopenko for little children in a school in a Votic village.

Dialects 
Three definite dialect groups of Votic are known:
Western, the areas around the mouth of the Luga River
Eastern, in villages around Koporye
Krevinian, areas around the city of Bauska, Latvia

The Western dialect area can be further divided into the Central dialects (spoken around the village of Kattila) and the Lower Luga dialects.

Of these, only the Lower Luga dialect is still spoken.

In 1848 it was estimated that of a total of 5,298 speakers of Votic, 3,453 (65%) spoke the western dialect, 1,695 (35%) spoke the eastern and 150 (3%) spoke the dialect of Kukkuzi. Kreevin had 12–15 speakers in 1810, the last records of Kreevin speakers are from 1846. The Kreevin dialect was spoken in an enclave in Latvia by descendants of Votic prisoners of war who were brought to the Bauska area of Latvia in the 15th century by the Teutonic order. The last known speaker of the eastern dialect died in 1960, in the village of Icäpäivä (Itsipino).
A fourth dialect of Votic has often been claimed as well: the traditional language variety of the village of Kukkuzi. It shows a mix of features of Votic and neighboring Ingrian, and some linguists, e.g. Arvo Laanest have claimed that it is actually rather a dialect of Ingrian. The vocabulary and phonology of the dialect are largely Ingrian-based, but it shares some grammatical features with the main Votic dialects, probably representing a former Votic substratum. In particular, all phonological features that Votic shares specifically with Estonian (e.g. the presence of the vowel õ) are absent from the dialect. The Kukkuzi dialect has been declared to be dead since the 1970s, although three speakers have still been located in 2006.

Orthography 

In the 1920s, the Votic linguist Dmitri Tsvetkov wrote a Votic grammar using a modified Cyrillic alphabet. The current Votic alphabet was created by Mehmet Muslimov in 2004:

Some publications use tš or č instead.

One may find different orthographies for Votic in descriptive work. Some use a modified Cyrillic alphabet, and others a Latin one. At least a couple of ways exist for indicating long vowels in Votic; placing a macron over the vowel (such as ā) as in Latvian, or as in written Estonian and Finnish, doubling the vowel (aa). Geminate consonants are generally represented with two characters. The representation of central vowels varies. In some cases the practice is to use e̮ according to the standards of Uralic transcription, while in other cases the letter õ is used, as in Estonian.

Phonetics and phonology

Vowels 
Votic has 10 vowel qualities, all of which can be long or short; represented in the following chart. The vowels /ɨ/ and /ɨː/ are found only in loanwords. The Votic ⟨õ⟩ /ɤ/ , however, is impressionistically a bit higher than the Estonian ⟨õ⟩, with the rest of the vowel inventory generally corresponding to the ones found in Estonian.

Thus, tee 'road' is pronounced as tie. Votic also has a large inventory of diphthongs.

Votic has a system of vowel harmony, rather similar to Finnish in its overall behavior: the vowels are divided in three groups, front-harmonic, back-harmonic and neutral. Words may generally not contain both front-harmonic and back-harmonic vowels; but both groups can combine with neutral vowels. The front-harmonic vowels are ä e ö ü; the corresponding back-harmonic vowels are a õ o u. Unlike Finnish, Votic only has a single neutral vowel, i.

However, there are some exceptions with the behavior of o ö. Some suffixes including the vowel o do not harmonize (the occurrence of ö in non-initial syllables is generally a result of Finnish or Ingrian loan words), and similarly onomatopoetic words and loanwords are not necessarily subject to rules of vowel harmony.

Consonants

Notes:
Phonemic palatalised consonants occur mostly as the result of a former following , usually as geminates. In other environments they are almost entirely found in loanwords, primarily from Russian. In some words in certain dialects, a palatalised consonant may become phonemic by the loss of the following vowel, such as esimein > eśmein.

Nearly all Votic consonants may occur as geminates. Also, Votic also has a system of consonant gradation, which is discussed in further detail in the consonant gradation article, although a large amount of alternations involve voicing alternations.

The lateral  has a velarized allophone  when occurring adjacent to back vowels.

Voicing is not contrastive word-finally. Instead a type of sandhi occurs: voiceless  are realized before words beginning with a voiceless consonant, voiced  before voiced consonants (or vowels). Before a pause, the realization is voiceless lenis, ; the stops are here similar to the Estonian b d g. Thus:
 pre-pausal:  "thief"
 before a voiceless consonant:  "a thief comes"
 before a voiced consonant:  "a thief takes"

Grammar 

Votic is an agglutinating language much like the other Finnic languages. In terms of inflection on nouns, Votic has two numbers (singular, plural), and 16 cases: nominative, genitive, accusative (distinct for pronouns), partitive, illative, inessive, elative, allative, adessive, ablative, translative, essive, exessive, abessive, comitative, terminative.

Unlike Livonian, which has been influenced to a great extent by Latvian, Votic retained many of its Finnic characteristics. Although there are many loanwords from Russian, its phonological and grammatical influence on Votic is less marked than the Latvian influence on Livonian.

In terms of verbs, Votic has six tenses and aspects, two of which are basic: present, imperfect; and the rest of which are compound tenses: present perfect, past perfect, future and future perfect. Votic has three moods (conditional, imperative, potential), and two 'voices' (active and passive). Caution however should be used with the term 'passive', with Finnic languages though as a result of the fact that it is more active and 'impersonal' (it has an oblique 3rd person marker, and so is not really 'passive').

Cases 
Below is the word "poikõ" (boy), inflected in case and number.

Consonant gradation 
Votic consonant gradiation:

References

Further reading

External links 

 Votian at Indigenous Minority Languages of Russia
 The Red Book of the Peoples of the Russian Empire
 Classification of Votian dialects at wikiversity
 Чернявский В. М. Vaďďa ceeli. Izeõpõttaja / Водский язык. Самоучитель. (Note: The actual link is permanently dead)
Wikipedia language test in Votic
Водские сказки (stories in Votic)
Workbook for Vad'd'a sõnakõpittõja

Votians
Finnic languages
Ingria
Languages of Russia
Endangered Uralic languages